Madeleine Elizabeth Martin (born April 15, 1993) is an American actress, known for voicing JoJo Tickle, the title character in the animated TV series JoJo's Circus and portrayed the character Rebecca "Becca" Moody on Showtime comedy-drama Californication.

Early life
Martin grew up in New York City, United States. As her mother is from Canada, Martin has dual citizenship of both countries. She is a student at the School of American Ballet.. Martin was homeschooled.

Career
At age seven, Martin appeared in the Broadway National Tour of The Sound of Music with Richard Chamberlain. Two years later she portrayed young Cosette in the Broadway National Tour of Les Miserables. She appeared on Broadway in the title role in A Day in the Death of Joe Egg at the age of 10; her acclaimed performance gave her the opportunity to be the youngest presenter in history at the 2003 Tony Awards. The New York Times Arts and Leisure section profiled her when she was 12 years old. She also acted in The Pillowman alongside Jeff Goldblum and Billy Crudup. She acted in A Christmas Carol at Madison Square Garden.

Her first appearance on television came in 2003 on Law & Order, where she played the role of Annie for one episode. Also in 2003, she did the voice acting for the main character JoJo, in the cartoon TV series JoJo's Circus. She was a series regular on Disney's Out of the Box. She was called back in 2004 for another episode ("Sick"), on Law & Order: Special Victims Unit, as April. In 2005 she appeared for one episode on another TV series, Hope & Faith, as Ivana Charles.

In 2006 Martin was a voice actress in Ice Age: The Meltdown, where she voiced several roles.

She eventually returned to TV in 2007 to act alongside David Duchovny in the Showtime dramedy Californication. She plays Becca Moody, Duchovny's teenage daughter. Martin also performed several songs in Californication including "Only Women Bleed", "Don't Let Us Get Sick", and "Surrender".

Martin originated the role of "Jean Fordham" on Broadway in the hit play August: Osage County.

In 2010 she was a co-star alongside John Cena in the WWE Studios film, Legendary. Her performance was heavily criticized.

She voiced Finn's female-counterpart, Fionna in the Adventure Time episodes "Fionna and Cake", "Bad Little Boy", "The Prince Who Wanted Everything", "Five Short Tables" and "Fionna and Cake and Fionna". She also appeared in the Criminal Minds season 7 episode "Heathridge Manor".

Martin performed in the Atlantic Theater Company's production of Harper Regan in 2012 and on Broadway in Picnic in 2013.

From 2014 to 2016 she played Shelley Godfrey in the second and third season of Hemlock Grove and had a guest role on The Good Wife. She performed in the Lincoln Center production of The Harvest in the Winter of 2016.

In 2019, she portrayed Madeline in The Marvelous Mrs. Maisel, a recurring character in the third season. The character is a colleague of Abe's (the titular character's father) in his fight in rebellious causes.

Filmography

Film

Television

References

External links
 
 
 

1993 births
Living people
Actresses from New York City
American child actresses
American people of Canadian descent
American stage actresses
American television actresses
American voice actresses
People from Manhattan
21st-century American actresses